Don Sherman (6 October 1943 – 27 July 2017) was an Australian international lawn bowler, and a master builder by trade and bred cattle and horses.

Biography
He won a gold medal in the 1982 Commonwealth Games in Brisbane.

He won a gold medal at the Asia Pacific Bowls Championships in the 1985 fours at Tweed Heads, New South Wales.

He died on 27 July 2017 after a battle with illness at the age of 82.

References

Australian male bowls players
1934 births
Commonwealth Games medallists in lawn bowls
Commonwealth Games gold medallists for Australia
2017 deaths
Bowls players at the 1982 Commonwealth Games
20th-century Australian people
Medallists at the 1982 Commonwealth Games